The Mount Roland cable car is a proposed aerial lift (cable car) at Mount Roland, near Sheffield, Tasmania, Australia.

The proposal is being worked upon by the Sheffield-Mt Roland Cable Car Company, a venture by Brian Inder [deceased] of Tasmazia, and John Sinclair of Silver Ridge Retreat.

The route was first considered in the 1990s.  A report [no longer online via referenced link] from the University of Tasmania's Institute for Regional Development suggested that the cable car would appeal to people who cannot complete the four to six hours return walk to the summit.  A cable car was mentioned in Kentish Council's recreational blueprint for Mt Roland.

It is estimated that such a proposal would cost around A$13.5 million.  The group propose a community ownership model of the company.

This proposal is highly divisive in the community, and has met with only limited support and given rise to the Mount Roland Preservation Society.

References

Proposed aerial lifts
Proposed transport infrastructure in Australia
Transport in Tasmania
Aerial lifts in Australia